The Scotland men's national squash team represents Scotland in international squash team competitions, and is governed by the Scottish Squash and Racketball.

Since 1981, Scotland has participated in one semi final of the World Squash Team Open, in 2001.

Current team
 Alan Clyne
 Greg Lobban
 Angus Gillams
 Rory Stewart
 Stuart George
 Chris Leiper

Results

World Team Squash Championships

European Squash Team Championships

See also 
 Scottish Squash and Racketball
 World Team Squash Championships
 Scotland women's national squash team

References 

Squash teams
Men's national squash teams
Squash in Scotland
Squash